is the eighth studio album by Japanese pop band Pizzicato Five. The album was released on October 1, 1994 by the Nippon Columbia imprint Triad. It is their first studio album not to feature founding member Keitarō Takanami, who departed the band earlier in the year. Overdose is the first of several Pizzicato Five albums to be themed around a famous city, in this case New York. The album pays tribute to soul music, and soul singer Stevie Wonder in particular, with several songs incorporating Wonder's signature instrument, the harmonica.

Four singles were released from Overdose: "The Night Is Still Young", "Happy Sad", "Superstar" and "On the Sunny Side of the Street". The song "Airplane" was later re-recorded for the band's 1996 EP Sister Freedom Tapes as "Airplane '96". Several tracks from the album appeared on the band's 1995 compilation The Sound of Music by Pizzicato Five. Overdose was reissued by Readymade Records on September 30, 2000 and March 31, 2006.

Track listing

Charts

References

External links
 

1994 albums
Pizzicato Five albums
Nippon Columbia albums
Japanese-language albums
New York City in popular culture